Frank Lloyd (18 September 1876 – 1945) was an English professional footballer who played as an outside right.

Born in London, Lloyd played for Wednesbury Old Athletic, Woolwich Arsenal, Aston Villa and Dundee.

References

1876 births
1945 deaths
English footballers
Wednesbury Old Athletic F.C. players
Arsenal F.C. players
Aston Villa F.C. players
Dundee F.C. players
English Football League players
Association football outside forwards